Bodenhausen is a surname. Notable people with the surname include:

Erpo Freiherr von Bodenhausen (1897–1945), German World War II general
Galen Bodenhausen (born 1961), American social psychologist
Geoffrey Bodenhausen (born 1951), French chemist
Georg Bodenhausen, Dutch civil servant